The fifth season of Monk originally aired in the United States on USA Network from July 7, 2006, to March 2, 2007. It consisted of 16 episodes. Tony Shalhoub, Traylor Howard, Ted Levine, and Jason Gray-Stanford reprised their roles as the main characters.  A DVD of the season was released on June 26, 2007.

Crew
Andy Breckman continued his tenure as show runner.  Executive producers for the season included Breckman, David Hoberman, series star Tony Shalhoub, and writer Tom Scharpling. NBC Universal Television Studio was the primary production company backing the show.  Randy Newman's theme ("It's a Jungle Out There") continued to be used, while Jeff Beal's original instrumental theme could be heard in some episodes.  Directors for the season included Randall Zisk, Jerry Levine, Peter Weller, and Andrei Belgrader.  Writers for the season included Andy Breckman, David Breckman, Jonathan Collier, Hy Conrad, Daniel Dratch, Lee Goldberg, Dylan Morgan, William Rabkin, Josh Siegal, Joe Toplyn, and Tom Scharpling.

Cast

All four main characters returned for the fifth season.  Tony Shalhoub returned as former homicide detective Adrian Monk, with Traylor Howard returning as Monk's faithful assistant, Natalie Teeger.  Ted Levine returned as the SFPD captain, Leland Stottlemeyer, and Jason Gray-Stanford reprised his role as the lovable but oblivious Lieutenant Randy Disher.

The astronomical number of guest stars grew even higher for the fifth season.  Stanley Kamel returned as Monk's psychiatrist, Dr. Charles Kroger.  Emmy Clarke portrayed Julie Teeger, Natalie's daughter, in a third season.  Melora Hardin continued to portray Trudy Monk, Monk's deceased wife (whose murder is the series' main story arc), while Lindy Newton played a younger version of the character.  Tim Bagley returned to play Harold Krenshaw, Monk's main rival, after a one-season absence.  The character of Monk's annoying upstairs neighbor, Kevin Dorfman, was brought back, portrayed by Jarrad Paul.  Cody McMains starred, for the first time, as Dr. Kroger's son, Troy Kroger.  Michael Cavanaugh and Holland Taylor returned for the final time as Natalie's ultra-rich parents, Bob and Peggy Davenport, and Sharon Lawrence made her debut on the series as Stottlemeyer's girlfriend, Linda Fusco.  Additionally, several non-recurring guest stars made appearances, including Brooke Adams (Shalhoub's wife, playing her third different character), Joshua Alba, Sean Astin, Catherine Bach, Graham Beckel, Paul Blackthorne, Stephen Bogardus, Ivar Brogger, Sarah Brown, Dan Butler, Ricardo Chavira, Gordon Clapp, Alex Cohen, Alice Cooper, David DeLuise, Charles Durning, Art Evans, Tom Everett, Kevin Farley, Tamara Feldman, John Furey, Deborah Geffner, Greg Grunberg, Dan Hedaya, Brad Hunt, Jamie Kaler, Brian Kerwin, Jennifer Lawrence, James Logan, Chi McBride, Brian McNamara, Jacob Miller, Silas Weir Mitchell, Sandra Nelson, Lawrence O'Donnell, Jim Piddock, Andy Richter, Bryce Robinson, Kiernan Shipka, Peter James Smith, Cynthia Stevenson, Heather Tom, Stanley Tucci (in an Emmy award-winning performance), Reginald VelJohnson, Steven Weber, Frederick Weller, Peter Weller, Chris Williams, Danny Woodburn, and Odette Yustman.

Episodes

Awards and nominations

Emmy Awards
Outstanding Actor – Comedy Series (Tony Shalhoub, nominated)
Outstanding Guest Actor – Comedy Series (Stanley Tucci for playing "David Ruskin" in "Mr. Monk and the Actor", won)

Golden Globe Awards
Best Actor – Musical or Comedy Series (Tony Shalhoub, nominated)

Screen Actors Guild
Outstanding Actor – Comedy Series (Tony Shalhoub, nominated)

References

Monk (TV series)
2006 American television seasons
2007 American television seasons
Monk (TV series) seasons